Utena Arena is a sport arena in Utena, Lithuania. The construction started on 30 October 2007 and was completed on 30 April 2009. It cost 35 million LTL. Utena Arena is a home arena of BC Juventus basketball team which plays its home matches of the Lithuanian Basketball League and Baltic Basketball League.

External links

Sports venues completed in 2009
Utena
Indoor arenas in Lithuania
Basketball venues in Lithuania
Buildings and structures in Utena County